Zheuzhyk is a creature of Belarusian mythology. It is considered to be a good creature that lives deeply in the lake bed. Zheuzhyk is considered to be the guardian of rivers and lakes of Belarus.

Description
In Belarusian folklore Zheuzhyk is described as a thin old man with a long red beard, long and thin arms and legs.

Mode of life

As it is said in Belarusian myths, during a day Zheuzhyk swims underwater, and at night Zheuzhyk slowly swims round its possession on boat, dispersing the waves. There is a belief, that is somebody gets into a trouble on water, Zheuzhyk will surely come to rescue. Zheuzhyk is so strong that it may even stop the wind and the storm.

See also
 Damavik
 Dzedka
 Lazavik
 Shatans
 Younik
 Zhytsen
 Zlydzens

References

Belarusian folklore
Slavic legendary creatures
Slavic tutelary deities